Cheryl Carasik (born 1952) is a set decorator. She has been nominated for five Academy Awards in the category Best Art Direction.

Selected filmography
 A Little Princess (1995)
 The Birdcage (1996)
 Men in Black (1997)
 The Hulk (2003)
 Lemony Snicket's A Series of Unfortunate Events (2004)
 Pirates of the Caribbean: Dead Man's Chest (2006)
 Pirates of the Caribbean: At World's End (2007)
 State of Play (2009)
 Winnie the Pooh (2011)
 Larry Crowne (2011)
 Abraham Lincoln: Vampire Hunter (2012)
 The Lone Ranger (2013)
 The Judge (2014)

References

External links

1952 births
Living people
Set decorators
Place of birth missing (living people)